Faye Elaine Marsay (born 30 December 1986) is an English actress. Her notable roles include Anne Neville in The White Queen (2013), the recurring character Candice in Fresh Meat (2013), Steph in the film Pride (2014), Amy in Need for Speed (2015), The Waif in the fifth and sixth seasons of Game of Thrones (2015–2016), Blue Colson in the Black Mirror episode "Hated in the Nation" (2016), and Vel Sartha in Andor (2022).

Early life
Marsay was born in Middlesbrough. She moved to Loftus, North Yorkshire, where she attended the Laurence Jackson School in Guisborough. Marsay went on to Prior Pursglove College, before joining the Bristol Old Vic Theatre School, where she played the roles of Sissy Jupe in Hard Times, First Wyrd Sister and Fleance in Macbeth, Runt in Disco Pigs, and Shen Te in The Good Soul of Szechuan. It was during her time at the Old Vic school that she won the Spotlight Prize of 2012. As soon as she graduated, she landed a main role in The White Queen.

Career
In 2008, Marsay played Sue in the comedy drama Is That It?. She rose to prominence in 2013, playing Anne Neville in The White Queen. Next, Marsay played new "fresher" Candice Pelling in the TV series Fresh Meat.

In 2014, Marsay played the role of Lizzie Lancaster in series two of The Bletchley Circle. In September, she had two projects debut, the first being BAFTA nominated film Pride, in which she played the character of Steph. The second was the TV miniseries murder mystery Glue. Marsay played the character Janine Riley. Marsay also appeared in the 2014 Doctor Who Christmas special "Last Christmas" as Shona McCullough. The character of Shona was intended by showrunner Steven Moffat to become a new, permanent companion, replacing Jenna Coleman who had decided to leave the production. Coleman changed her mind during filming and an additional final scene was added at the last minute, reversing her exit, and leaving Shona to her current life.

2015 began with Marsay appearing in the fifth season of the popular HBO series Game of Thrones as the Waif. In June, Marsay was cast as new character Katie Springer in the TV series My Mad Fat Diary for the final season. At the beginning of October, Marsay was named one of Screen International's 2015 Stars of Tomorrow.

In October 2015, a radio drama debuted on BBC Radio 4 called The Price of Oil. The episode "No Two Days" starred Marsay as Izzie. In November, Marsay appeared as Amy in the video game Need for Speed, donning an American accent. Next, the short film NippleJesus, based on the short story by Nick Hornby, debuted at the Austin Film Festival and premiered in London, though it has not yet been made available to mass audiences. Marsay plays Siobhan.

2016 brought Marsay the role of Christine in the sixth season of ITV's Vera. She then continued her role as the Waif in Game of Thrones later that month. In May and June 2016, Marsay played the leading role of Nina Stibbe in the BBC's Love, Nina. Later that year, she appeared in "Hated in the Nation", an episode of the anthology series Black Mirror as Blue Colson alongside Kelly Macdonald.

In 2017 Marsay costarred in Daisy Aitkens' debut feature You, Me and Him with Lucy Punch and David Tennant, and appeared in the film Darkest Hour, starring Gary Oldman. She also appeared in a revival of Jim Cartwright's play Road at the Royal Court Theatre In December 2017, Marsay starred in ITV drama Bancroft alongside Sarah Parish. In 2017, she also appeared in Channel 4 drama Shamed.

In 2018, Marsay appeared in the BBC/AMC's McMafia, with James Norton. In November, Marsay appeared in A Private War alongside Rosamund Pike, Stanley Tucci and Jamie Dornan.

In 2019, Marsay played the role of DC Joanne Aspinall in the ITV six-part drama Deep Water, starring Anna Friel, Rosalind Eleazar, and Sinead Keenan. In 2020 she narrated two episodes of the E4 series The Sex Clinic. In 2022, she currently stars in the Star Wars television series Andor, a prequel to the movie Rogue One, as Vel Sartha.

Filmography

Film

Television

Stage

Radio

Video games

Awards and nominations

References

External links
 
 

Actresses from Yorkshire
Alumni of Bristol Old Vic Theatre School
Actors from Middlesbrough
English television actresses
English stage actresses
Living people
21st-century English actresses
English film actresses
English Shakespearean actresses
1986 births